Every Beat of My Heart may refer to:

 Every Beat of My Heart (Rod Stewart album), 1986
 Every Beat of My Heart (Sharissa album), 2005
 "Every Beat of My Heart" (song), a 1961 song by Gladys Knight & The Pips
 "Every Beat of My Broken Heart", a song by Hawk Nelson on their 2013 album Made

See also 
 "Beat of My Heart", a 2005 song by Hilary Duff